The Thomas and Beulah Shore House is a site on the National Register of Historic Places located in Miles City, Montana, United States.  It was added to the Register on December 18, 2003.

It was designed at least in part by Beulah Shore, who worked with contractor Fred Clearman & Sons in designing and constructing the home.

References

Houses in Custer County, Montana
Houses on the National Register of Historic Places in Montana
Buildings and structures in Miles City, Montana
National Register of Historic Places in Custer County, Montana
Houses completed in 1914
Bungalow architecture in Montana